Max Morris (1866 – June 6, 1909) was an American labor union leader and politician.

Born in Mobile, Alabama, Morris moved to Breckenridge, Colorado, in 1880.  In 1884, he became a retail clerk, and he organized a union of clerks based in Cripple Creek, Colorado.  In about 1890, he moved to Denver, where he founded the Denver Retail Clerks' Union, and he soon affiliated this to the new Retail Clerks' National Protective Association of America.

In 1896, Morris was elected as secretary-treasurer of the Retail Clerks, and from 1899, he also edited its journal, the Retail Clerks' National Advocate.  That year, he was elected to the Colorado House of Representatives, representing the People's Party.  He was elected again in 1901, this time representing the Democratic Party, serving until 1904.

Morris served as a vice-president of the American Federation of Labor from 1898.  He died in 1909, still holding his trade union offices.

References

1866 births
1909 deaths
American trade union leaders
Members of the Colorado House of Representatives
People from Mobile, Alabama
People's Party (United States) politicians
Trade unionists from Alabama